Must Be Nice is the second studio album by American rapper G-Eazy. It was released on September 26, 2012.

Track listing

Charts

References

2012 albums
G-Eazy albums